Rosamond Wolff Purcell (born 1942) is an American photographer. Purcell is known for her photographic works that explore subjects in natural history, science, and biology.

She was the subject of the 2016 documentary film An Art That Nature Makes: The Work of Rosamond Purcell by Molly Bernstein. Her work is included in the permanent collections of: Art Institute of Chicago, the National Gallery of Canada., Museum of Fine Arts (Boston), the Philadelphia Museum of Art, the National Academy of Science, and the Victoria and Albert in London.

Rosamond Purcell: Nature Stands Aside, the first retrospective exhibition of the artist’s work, was presented by the Addison Gallery of American Art in Andover, Massachusetts, during September through December 2022.

Publications

References

External links
  (audio interview, 13 minutes)
 
 

Living people
20th-century American photographers
21st-century American photographers
1942 births
20th-century American women photographers
21st-century American women photographers